Damjan Gajser (born 8 May 1970) is a Slovenian football manager and former player who is the current manager of Slovenian club Beltinci.

Gajser was capped eleven times for the Slovenian national team between 1995 and 1997.

See also
Slovenian international players

References

External links

1970 births
Living people
Slovenian footballers
Slovenia international footballers
Slovenian expatriate footballers
Association football midfielders
Slovenian PrvaLiga players
NK Mura players
NK Olimpija Ljubljana (1945–2005) players
NK Maribor players
NK Rudar Velenje players
Expatriate footballers in Croatia
Slovenian expatriate sportspeople in Croatia
Croatian Football League players
NK Zadar players
NK Primorje players
Expatriate footballers in Austria
Slovenian expatriate sportspeople in Austria
DSV Leoben players
Slovenian football managers